Jeremy Combs (born November 24, 1995) is an American basketball player for Saigon Heat. He played college basketball for Texas Southern University, where was named the 2019 Southwestern Athletic Conference Player of the Year.

After a high school career at David W. Carter High School in Dallas, Combs committed to North Texas Mean Green men's basketball, where he played for coach Tony Benford. In three seasons for the Mean Green, Combs averaged 12 points and 8.2 rebounds for the team and as a sophomore was named second-team All-Conference USA. At the close of Combs' three seasons at North Texas, Benford was fired and subsequently hired as an assistant at Louisiana State University (LSU). Combs was eligible as a graduate transfer and followed Benford to Baton Rouge.

In his lone season at LSU, Combs was limited to six games as he struggled with the lingering effects of his ankle injury suffered at North Texas. Following the season, he and LSU parted ways, but he was granted a fifth year of eligibility and transferred to Texas Southern to complete it. Combs made the most of his extra year, averaging 17 points and 9 rebounds per game and earning Southwestern Athletic Conference (SWAC) Player of the Year honors.

Following the close of his college career, Combs signed with the Köping Stars of the Swedish Basketligan. On October 7, 2019, Combs got named to the SBL Team of the Week for the first time. After the season got shortened due to the COVID-19 pandemic, and Köping on a third place (they received a bronze medal), Combs got awarded the SBL Center Of The Year on April 7, 2020.

References

External links
Texas Southern Tigers bio
LSU Tigers bio
North Texas Mean Green bio
College stats @ basketball-reference.com

1995 births
Living people
American expatriate basketball people in Sweden
American men's basketball players
Basketball players from Dallas
LSU Tigers basketball players
North Texas Mean Green men's basketball players
Power forwards (basketball)
Small forwards
Texas Southern Tigers men's basketball players